Victor Kugler (5 June 1900 – 14 December 1981) was one of the people who helped hide Anne Frank and her family and friends during the Nazi occupation of the Netherlands. In Anne Frank's posthumously published diary, Het Achterhuis, known in English as The Diary of a Young Girl, he was referred to under the name Mr. Kraler.

Kugler was born in Hohenelbe (now Vrchlabí) in the German-speaking part of Königgrätz region (Královéhradecký kraj/Hradec Králové Region), north-eastern Bohemia, Austria-Hungary, now in the Czech Republic, to Emile Kugler. He joined the Austro-Hungarian Navy during the First World War once his education was completed, but was discharged in 1918 after being wounded. He moved to Germany and worked as an electrician, then in 1920, Kugler moved to Utrecht, the Netherlands, to work for a company selling pectin. He joined the Amsterdam branch of Opekta as Otto Frank's deputy in 1924. He became a Dutch citizen in May 1938. In 1940, this allowed him to prevent the Nazi confiscation of Opekta and he accepted the directorship of the business, renamed Gies and Co, from Otto Frank.

From July 1942 to August 1944, he aided his colleagues Miep Gies, Johannes Kleiman and Bep Voskuijl in the concealment of eight people, including Anne Frank, in a sealed-off annex in their office premises on Amsterdam's Prinsengracht. He was arrested by the Gestapo on 4 August 1944, by the Austrian Nazi Karl Silberbauer.

He was interrogated at the Gestapo headquarters on the Euterpestraat, then transferred the same day to a prison for Jews and 'political prisoners' awaiting deportation on the Amstelveenseweg. On 7 September, he was moved to the prison on Weteringschans, in a cell with people sentenced to death. This was followed, four days later on September 11, by a transport to a concentration camp in Amersfoort, in the province of Utrecht, where he was selected for transport to Germany. On 17 September, the Amersfoort train station was destroyed in a bombing (Arnhem Air Raid) and on 26 September, he and around 1100 other men were taken to Zwolle for forced labour, digging anti-tank trenches.
Kugler was moved again on 30 December 1944, to Wageningen for forced labour digging under the German S.A. (Brownshirts or Storm Troopers) until 28 March 1945, when some 600 prisoners were marched from Wageningen through Renkum, Heelsum, Oosterbeek, Arnhem, and Westervoort, to Zevenaar with the intention of going on to Germany the following day. There was a bombing raid during the march and Kugler took advantage of the confusion to escape. He was hidden by a farmer for a few days, borrowed a bicycle and made his way back to Hilversum, where he lived, and which he reached in April 1945. He hid there in his own house until the liberation of the Netherlands on 5 May 1945.

His wife, Laura Kugler, died on 6 December 1952 and three years later he married Loes (Lucy) van Langen. The couple moved to Canada, where the brother, sister and mother of Lucy already resided. On 16 September 1958, Kugler appeared as a guest challenger on the American TV panel show To Tell The Truth.

In 1973, he received the Yad Vashem Medal of the Righteous among the Nations and in 1977 the Canadian Anti-Defamation League awarded him a 10,000 dollar prize in recognition of his assistance in the hiding of the Frank and van Pels families, as well as Fritz Pfeffer.

Further reading 
 Victor Kugler: The Man Who Hid Anne Frank, Eda Shapiro and Rick Kardonne, Gefen Publishing House, 2008. 
 The Diary of Anne Frank: The Revised Critical Edition, Anne Frank, edited by David Barnouw and Gerrold van der Stroom, translated by Arnold J. Pomerans, compiled by H. J. J. Hardy, second edition, Doubleday, 2003.
 Roses from the Earth: the Biography of Anne Frank, Carol Ann Lee, Penguin, 1999.
 Anne Frank: the Biography, Melissa Müller, Bloomsbury, 1999.
 The Footsteps of Anne Frank, Ernst Schnabel, Pan, 1988.
 The Hidden Life of Otto Frank, Carol Ann Lee, Penguin, 2002.

External links
 Victor Kugler – his activity to save Jews' lives during the Holocaust, at Yad Vashem website
  - obituary, [The New York Times] website
  "Main Characters" at [Anne Frank House] website

1900 births
1981 deaths
20th-century Czech people
20th-century Austrian people
Dutch Righteous Among the Nations
Amersfoort concentration camp survivors
Austro-Hungarian military personnel of World War I
Dutch people of World War II
German Bohemian people
Austrian people of German Bohemian descent
Austrian emigrants to Canada
Canadian people of Austrian descent
Canadian people of Czech descent
Austrian expatriates in the Netherlands
People from Vrchlabí
Anne Frank